An Alibi for Death (German: Ein Alibi zerbricht) is a 1963 Austrian-German crime drama film directed by Alfred Vohrer and starring Ruth Leuwerik, Peter van Eyck and Charles Regnier.

It was shot at the Rosenhügel Studios in Vienna with sets designed by the art director Fritz Jüptner-Jonstorff.

Cast
 Ruth Leuwerik as Dr. Maria Rohn 
 Peter van Eyck as Günther Rohn
 Charles Regnier as Dr. Hartleben
 Sieghardt Rupp as Leopold Wasneck 
 Hannelore Elsner as Hanne Wasneck
 Dieter Klein as Ulrich Holletz
 Michael Janisch as Martin Siebeck
 Fritz Schmiedel as Kommissar Seifert
 Elisabeth Stiepl as Frau Siebeck 
 Klaus Münster as Robert Vierhage
 Guido Wieland as Portier 
 Mario Kranz as Regenbaum
 Walter Regelsberger as criminal-Assistant Peters
 Herbert Kersten as coroner
 Elisabeth Epp as Anna

References

Bibliography 
 Davidson, John & Hake, Sabine. Framing the Fifties: Cinema in a Divided Germany. Berghahn Books, 2007.

External links 
 

1963 films
1963 crime drama films
Austrian crime drama films
German crime drama films
West German films
1960s German-language films
Films directed by Alfred Vohrer
Gloria Film films
Films shot at Rosenhügel Studios
1960s German films